Cephalalgia: An International Journal of Headache is a peer-reviewed medical journal covering research on headache. It is published by SAGE Publications on behalf of the International Headache Society; it was previously published by Blackwell Publishing. The journal was established in 1981 and currently has 16 issues per year. The editor-in-chief is Arne May.

Abstracting and indexing 
The journal is abstracted and indexed in MEDLINE, Scopus, the Science Citation Index, Current Contents/Clinical Medicine, Current Contents/Life Sciences, and BIOSIS Previews. According to the Journal Citation Reports, its 2020 impact factor is 6.292.

References

External links
 

Neurology journals
English-language journals
SAGE Publishing academic journals
Publications established in 1981
Headaches